ACM Air Charter is a German airline based at Karlsruhe/Baden-Baden Airport. In addition to charter flights and aircraft management the airline operates the business aviation terminal and a maintenance facility at its homebase airport.

History 

ACM Air Charter was founded in 1992 in Baden-Baden. One year later in 1993, flight operations commenced. In 1997 the airline moved its headquarters to Karlsruhe / Baden-Baden Airport, where the company now also owns two hangars. It created a second business area with its maintenance department. In 1998 the airline received the approval for line and base maintenance. In the same year the first commercially approved Bombardier Challenger 604 in Germany was put into service, enabling long-haul charter flights.

In 2008 the first ultra-long range business jet was added to the fleet. The Bombardier Global Express XRS allows nonstop transatlantic flights and flights to Asia. The licence to operate the first commercially registered Dassault Falcon 7X in Germany was extended in 2010, adding another ultra-long range jet to the airline’s fleet.

In 2011, ACM Air Charter went into an agreement with Continuum Applied Technology for the implementation of the CORRIDOR Aviation Service Software, an application designed to automate all aspects of the complex maintenance of aircraft.

In 2014 ACM Air Charter received its second Boeing BBJ 2, offering ultra-long haul flights with a modern and high-class business aircraft.

Due to the new Part-NCC regulation, which entered into force in 2016, ACM took over the operation of a non-commercial Embraer Phenom 300 in March 2017.

Fleet 
As of November 2020, the fleet of ACM Air Charter consists of the following aircraft:

See also 
 List of airlines of Germany

References

External links 
 
 ACM Air Charter on Charterscanner.com

Airlines of Germany
Airlines established in 1992